Hypersypnoides formosensis is a species of moth of the family Noctuidae first described by George Hampson in 1926. It is found in Taiwan.

The wingspan is 50 mm.

References

Moths described in 1926
Calpinae